Second Expedition of Wadi al-Qura took place in January, 628AD, 9th month of 6AH of the Islamic calendar  The raid was carried out by Zayd ibn Harithah or Abu Bakr, as a revenge for an ambush carried out by Banu Fazara against a party of 12 scouts led by Zayd ibn Harithah to monitor the surroundings of Medina against attacks from hostile tribes. The party was attacked as they slept at night, nine Muslims were killed, Zayd ibn Harithah himself escaped after suffering several wounds.

Background
Zaid bin Harith went on a trading expedition towards Syria and with him was the merchandise for the Companions of Muhammed.  While he was near Wadi’l Qura he met a party from the Tribe of Fazara of Banu Badr. They attacked him and his companions and snatched all that was with them (of merchandise).

Some of his fellows were killed and he himself was carried wounded from the field. Zaid vowed that he would not wash his head for ritual purity (i.e. he vowed to abstain from sexual intercourse) until he fought the people of Fazara.

Revenge attack
After his recovery from the injury and following the morning prayer, the detachment was given orders to raid the enemy.  He attacked them at Wadi al-Qura and inflicted heavy casualties on them. Some of them were killed and others captured. In all 30 horsemen were killed, including the leader who was an old woman named Umm Qirfa.

He took Umm Qirfa, the aunt of Uyeina back to Muhammad. Zayd also took Umm Qirfa's daughter as a captive and was given to Muhammad, who gave her to the Meccans in exchange for Muslim prisoners (according to the Sahih Muslim hadith collection).

Islamic primary sources
The event is mentioned in detail in the Sunni hadith collection, Sahih Muslim. It mentions that Umm Qirfa's daughter was exchanged for Muslim prisoners, who were held in Mecca.

See also
Military career of Muhammad
List of expeditions of Muhammad

References

627
Campaigns ordered by Muhammad